Didiévi Department is a department of Bélier Region in Lacs District, Ivory Coast. In 2021, its population was 93,629 and its seat is the settlement of Didiévi. The sub-prefectures of the department are Boli, Didiévi, Molonou-Blé, Raviart, and Tié-N'Diékro.

History
Didiévi Department was created in 2005 as a second-level subdivision via a split-off from Tiébissou Department. At its creation, it was part of Lacs Region.

In 2011, districts were introduced as new first-level subdivisions of Ivory Coast. At the same time, regions were reorganised and became second-level subdivisions and all departments were converted into third-level subdivisions. At this time, Didiévi Department became part of Bélier Region in Lacs District.

Notes

Departments of Bélier
2005 establishments in Ivory Coast
States and territories established in 2005